

Heritage and History 

Kathmandu University High School (KUHS) is a high school in Chaukot, Panauti, in the Kavrepalanchok District, Nepal. Kathmandu University High School, initially named as Kathmandu University Preparatory School was established in 1998 A.D. with only 60 primary students from local areas and children of the staffs of Kathmandu University. The School started in a rented building near by a beautiful place called Bansghari in Dhulikhel with few staff by Mr. Aiden Warlow as a principal. The school always has been a non-profit making organization established under the umbrella of Kathmandu University.

In 2000, the school was successful to win the trust of its well-wishers and moved to its own beautiful new campus in Chaukot, provided by Kathmandu University.  Each year it added one intake until class 10 renaming it to be Kathmandu University High School later. The secondary students appeared the first S.L.C examination in the year 2003 with outstanding achievements in various subjects. In 2009, the school opened the A level programme from the University of Cambridge International Examinations.

The school has now been in operation for 20 years and has produced a new generation of leaders and professionals with a caring and responsible attitude toward society. KUHS has withstood changing fortunes in the twenty years since its inception, but it has stood the test of time. It has promised to continue providing quality education to children and to produce thinkers who are not reliant on rote learning and exam cramming for their education. Students continue to forge their own path and learn through observations, experiments, and research.

The school currently has four major buildings for teaching and learning from grades one to twelve. This year, the school was able to establish its own Primary Boys and Girls Hostels on campus, as well as relocate the Secondary Boys Hostel in the School area. This year, the school began its (10 + 2) examination in Science stream, in addition to the A level programme from the University of Cambridge International Examinations. It has a bright future thanks to the support and cooperation of highly qualified and trained teaching and non-teaching staff at Kathmandu University and Dhulikhel Teaching Hospital.

References

Further reading

External links
KUHS Site 

Secondary schools in Nepal
Educational institutions established in 1998
Education in Kavrepalanchok District
Organisations associated with Kathmandu University
1998 establishments in Nepal
Buildings and structures in Kavrepalanchok District